Robert Allen Suter (May 16, 1957 – September 9, 2014) was an American professional ice hockey defenseman and member of the Miracle on Ice 1980 U.S. Olympic hockey team who won the gold medal.

He was the brother of former National Hockey League (NHL) player Gary Suter and father of current NHL player Ryan Suter currently playing for the Dallas Stars. Another son, Garrett, played for the University of Wisconsin–Stevens Point in the Northern Collegiate Hockey Association. His nephew Jeremy Dehner is a defenseman with most of his career spent in European professional leagues.

Amateur career 
Born in Madison, Wisconsin, Suter attended Madison East High School. He played college hockey at University of Wisconsin–Madison and was a member of the 1977 NCAA hockey champion Wisconsin Badgers. He was mostly noted for his rough play, setting several Badger records for penalty minutes before leaving in 1979. He initially joined the Tulsa Oilers under a tryout contract for a few games in late 1979, but soon joined the 1980 US Olympic hockey team on a full-time basis, where he won the gold medal.

Professional career 
Suter was selected with the 120th pick in the 1977 NHL Entry Draft by the Los Angeles Kings of the NHL and also 58th overall in the 1977 World Hockey Association draft by the Birmingham Bulls. He rejected Los Angeles' contract offer following the 1980 Olympics, and instead sat out 1980–81 season to become an unrestricted free agent. He came out of retirement in the spring of 1981 to play for the United States team at the 1981 Ice Hockey World Championship tournament in Stockholm. Suter signed with the Minnesota North Stars as an unrestricted free agent in 1981, but spent the entire 1981–82 season in the Central Hockey League with the Nashville South Stars farm team. He retired in 1982 without playing a single game in the NHL.

Post playing career 
Suter returned to Madison after his retirement and opened a sporting goods store called Gold Medal Sports. He also coached youth hockey in Madison after his retirement and became a part-owner and director of Capitol Ice Arena in Middleton, Wisconsin.  Ten months after Suter's death the Capitol Ice Arena was renamed in his honor and is now known as "Bob Suter's Capitol Ice Arena."

Death 
Suter died on September 9, 2014, of a heart attack suffered at Capitol Ice Arena. He was the first player from the 1980 U.S. Olympic hockey team to die.  In July 2015, Capitol Ice Arena was renamed as Bob Suter's Capitol Ice Arena in his memory.

In popular culture 
Suter was not featured in a 1981 TV movie about the 1980 U.S. hockey team called Miracle on Ice, except in archival footage of the gold medal ceremony.

In the 2004 Disney film Miracle, he is portrayed by Pete Duffy.

Awards and achievements 

 1980 Olympics Gold Medal

Career statistics

Regular season and playoffs

International

References

External links 
 
 Bob Suter's hockeydraftcentral.com bio
 Bob Suter: #20, a brief history of Bob, Gary and Ryan Suter
 Bob Suter's Capitol Ice Arena

1957 births
2014 deaths
1980 US Olympic ice hockey team
American men's ice hockey defensemen
Birmingham Bulls draft picks
Ice hockey players from Wisconsin
Ice hockey players at the 1980 Winter Olympics
Los Angeles Kings draft picks
Medalists at the 1980 Winter Olympics
Minnesota Wild scouts
Nashville South Stars players
Olympic gold medalists for the United States in ice hockey
Sportspeople from Madison, Wisconsin
Tulsa Oilers (1964–1984) players
People from Middleton, Wisconsin
Madison East High School alumni
NCAA men's ice hockey national champions